Carlo Ranzoni born 2 November 1965 is a Swiss Jurist and Judge at the European Court of Human Rights representing the Principality of Liechtenstein.

Education 
Carlo Ranzoni enrolled in the University of St.Gallen  in 1985 from where he obtained a Master of Laws in 1989. Before he passed the Bar exam for the Bar St. Gallen in 1992 he gained some juridical practice in the District Court of Flawil, the Court of Appeal in the Canton of St.Gallen and a law firm, also in St.Gallen.

Professional career 
From 1992 to 2000 he was a court clerk in the Court of Appeal in St.Gallen. Concordantly he was a substitute judge at the Court of Appeal in St.Gallen from September 1998 and November 1999. Since he represented Liechtenstein in a various conferences at the United Nations and the Council of Europe(CoE) and took a seat in committees on behalf of Liechtenstein which discussed the children's and women rights within the framework of the Lanzarote Convention and the Istanbul Convention.

Political affiliation 
He is a member of the Christian Peoples Party (CVP).

Judge at the European Court of Human Rights 
On the 21 April 2015 he was elected by the PACE as a member of the European Court of Human Rights in Strasbourg. He assumed the office on the 1 September 2015, succeeding Mark Villiger.

References 

Living people
1965 births
Swiss jurists
Swiss judges on the courts of Liechtenstein
Swiss judges of international courts and tribunals
People from St. Gallen (city)